The Greenawalt Building, also known as the Kogan Building, was an historic commercial building, which was located in Harrisburg, Dauphin County, Pennsylvania.

Added to the National Register of Historic Places in 1983, this building was delisted in 1998 after it was demolished.

History and architectural features
Built in 1863, the Greenawalt Building was a five-story structure that was designed in the Italianate style. 

Among its tenants were the first YMCA in Harrisburg and the Harrisburg League of Municipal Improvements, where the City Beautiful campaign was launched. 

It subsequently became the warehouse and showroom for the J & J.K. Greenawalt Tanners and Curriers.

It was added to the National Register of Historic Places in 1983, but was delisted in 1998 after it was demolished.

References

Commercial buildings on the National Register of Historic Places in Pennsylvania
Italianate architecture in Pennsylvania
Commercial buildings completed in 1863
Buildings and structures in Harrisburg, Pennsylvania
National Register of Historic Places in Harrisburg, Pennsylvania
Category:YMCA buildings in the United States